Tavis MacMillan (born September 9, 1970) is a Canadian former professional ice hockey player and coach. He has previously served as both assistant and head coach for Alaska after having played for the Nanooks for four seasons.

Career statistics

Head coaching record

References

External links

1970 births
Living people
Alaska Nanooks men's ice hockey coaches
Alaska Nanooks men's ice hockey players
Atlanta Thrashers personnel
Canadian ice hockey coaches
Canadian ice hockey players
Ice hockey people from Alberta
People from the County of Warner No. 5
Winnipeg Jets scouts
San Jose Rhinos players
Greensboro Monarchs players